Erigeron krylovii is an Asian species of flowering plants in the family Asteraceae. It grows in grasslands and in alpine meadows in Siberia, Xinjiang, and Kazakhstan.

Erigeron krylovii is a perennial, clump-forming herb up to 60 cm (5 feet) tall, forming woody rhizomes and a branching underground caudex. Its flower heads have pink, thread-like ray florets surrounding yellow disc florets.

References

krylovii
Flora of Asia
Plants described in 1945